Seida is a Palestinian town in the Tulkarm Governorate in the eastern West Bank, located 20 kilometers northeast of Tulkarm. According to the Palestinian Central Bureau of Statistics, Seida had a population of 3,076 inhabitants in 2006.

History
Ceramics from the   Iron Age II,  Hellenistic, early and late Roman, Byzantine, early Muslim and the Middle Ages have been found here.

In 1179, during the Crusader era, it appeared as an estate, sold to the Zion Monastery in Jerusalem.

In 1265, Seida was one of the estates given by Sultan Baibars to his followers after his victory over the Crusaders, with the whole of Seida given to  emir Husam al-Din Itamish b. Utlis Khan.

Ottoman era
In 1517, Seida, like all of Palestine, was incorporated into the Ottoman Empire.  In the 1596  tax registers,  it was part of the nahiya ("subdistrict") of Jabal Sami, part of the larger Sanjak of Nablus. It had a population of 70 households and 2 bachelors, all Muslims. The inhabitants paid a fixed tax rate of 33,3% on agricultural products, including wheat, barley, summer crops, olive trees, goats and beehives, in addition to occasional revenues  and a fixed tax for people of Nablus area; a total of 12,160  akçe.  All of the revenue went to a Waqf.

In the 1882 PEF's Survey of Western Palestine (SWP),  Saida is described as: "a small village, with a well on the east on the back of a long and bare ridge."

British Mandate era
In the 1922 census of Palestine conducted  by the British Mandate authorities, Saida  had a population of 252 Muslims, increasing in the 1931 census to 351 Muslims, living in 75 houses.

In  the 1945 statistics  the population of Seida was 450 Muslims,  with  5,060  dunams of land  according to an official land and population survey. Of this, 1,622  dunams were plantations and irrigable land, 1,113 were used for cereals, while 11 dunams were built-up (urban) land.

Jordanian era
In the wake of the 1948 Arab–Israeli War, and after the 1949 Armistice Agreements,  Seida  came  under Jordanian rule.

In 1961, the population was  808.

Post 1967
Since the Six-Day War in 1967, Seida has been under Israeli occupation.

Notable people
Abelhaleem Hasan Abdelraziq Ashqar

References

Bibliography

External links
 Welcome To Seida
Survey of Western Palestine, Map 11:    IAA, Wikimedia commons

Villages in the West Bank
Municipalities of the State of Palestine